Patrick McKenna (born 1960) is a Canadian actor.

Patrick McKenna may also refer to:
 Patrick McKenna (Ingenious Media) (born 1956), chief executive of Ingenious Media
 Patrick McKenna (bishop) (1868–1942), Roman Catholic Bishop of Clogher in Ireland
 Patrick McKenna (Irish politician), Irish politician and farmer
 Patrick McKenna, a character in the film Angels & Demons
 Pat McKenna (footballer) (1920–1995), Scottish footballer, played for Aberdeen, Plymouth Argyle and St. Johnstone
 Patrick McKenna (baseball) (1854–1922), Major League Baseball center fielder
 Patrick McKenna, informer for the Great Train Robbery in 1963